Sixten Veit (born 7 January 1970) is a German former professional footballer who played as a midfielder. He made four appearances for Beşiktaş in the Turkish Süper Lig during 2001.

Honours
Hertha BSC
 DFB-Ligapokal finalist: 2000

References

External links
 

Living people
1970 births
German footballers
East German footballers
Association football midfielders
DDR-Oberliga players
Bundesliga players
2. Bundesliga players
Süper Lig players
Chemnitzer FC players
Hertha BSC players
Beşiktaş J.K. footballers
1. FC Union Berlin players
Hallescher FC players
German expatriate footballers
German expatriate sportspeople in Turkey
Expatriate footballers in Turkey